Kseniya Oleksandrivna Paskar (née Simonova; ; born 22 April 1985) is a Ukrainian performance artist who does sand animation, graphic design, illustration, cinema, and literature. She holds the title of Merited Artist of Ukraine and rose to prominence in 2009 after winning Ukraine's Got Talent. She was the only one to receive two Golden Buzzers on two different "The Champions" series of the Got Talent franchise :America's Got Talent: The Champions and Britain's Got Talent: The Champions, both in 2019.

Early life
Simonova was born in 1985, in Yevpatoria, a town on the Crimean peninsula in Ukraine, which was then a part of the Soviet Union. Her mother, Irina Simonova, is an artist, a theatrical designer and teacher of fine arts. Her father, Alexander Simonov, is a former military officer who runs a business in furniture design. Since she was a child, Kseniya painted, drew and designed with her mother.

Simonova's parents discouraged her from a career as an artist. She explained, "It is a constant struggle. I knew that and was ready for it. If you chose this profession, you're struggling all your life. You do not enjoy everyday life - like comfort, and buying furniture... You're always looking for something more, and actually, I was never interested in a life of comfort and buying furniture."

In 2007 Simonova married Igor Paskar, a theatre director, journalist and magazine editor. They have two sons.

Education and early career
Simonova graduated from the Artistic School of Yevpatoria and studied at the School of Fine Arts, where she wrote research papers on English folk poetry and 15th and 16th century English folk songs and ballads. She also translated folk poetry and poets, including William Shakespeare, Robert Burns and George Gordon Byron. In 2002, Simonova pursued a major in psychology and graduated from the Tavrida National V.I. Vernadsky University in 2007 with honors and a scientific specialization in psychophysiology. While studying these sciences, Simonova also entered the Ukrainian Academy of Printing in 2003, where she studied graphic design. She graduated in 2008, six months after giving birth to her first son.

Since 2006 Simonova has worked for the magazine Crimean Riviera as an artist. In 2007, Simonova and Paskar launched a bilingual magazine, Chocolate in English and Russian, which ceased production a year later due to the financial crisis.

Sand animation 

Sand performance was suggested by Paskar. Initially, Simonova was unsure but decided to try it in the absence of other viable options to improve the family's financial situation. When tests with both beach and river sands proved to be unsuitable, Paskar researched better options on the Internet, and sold his printing equipment to buy three kilograms of expensive volcanic sand.

Ukraine's Got Talent 

Paskar suggested to Simonova that she should enter the competition Ukraine's Got Talent, where the prize was ₴1 million, the equivalent of US$110,000, and she decided to enter.

She presented a two-minute sand story and was selected as a semi-finalist. She wanted to perform a sand story about World War II, but the producers encouraged her to choose a more popular theme. She refused, saying, "I just want to bring some immortal sense to this show. Not just pictures or video clips. Something close to all hearts." The sand story Simonova presented live on TV was an eight-minute story of a young couple separated by the war.

In an interview she said, "It was so emotionally hard, and I now still can not think about those minutes without pain... My hands were dying and reviving making the images."

Kseniya passed the semi-finals and moved on to the finals. In the third round, she performed a sand story: Don't be too late!

Kseniya was declared the winner of the competition and collected 100,000 euros. The Guardian called her an online phenomenon after the video of her performance was viewed more than 2 million times on YouTube. After the competition, she became an international artist performer and began giving sand art performances in different countries of the world. With the money they won, Simonova and Paskar bought a house in Yevpatoria, and received invitations internationally to perform.

International artist performer 
Since 2009, Simonova has been performing her sand animation stories in different countries of the world, particularly in Europe, China, Qatar, India, Australia, Thailand, and Bhutan. She introduced her art at various events – from the Eurovision Song Contest in 2011 to the Champion League Final Gala in Milan in 2016. Simonova has performed in the presence of presidents and royalty in different countries. Among her audience were President of Malta George Abela; Her Majesty Queen Margrethe II of Denmark; Princess Sirindhorn of Thailand, Princess Marie of Denmark; Princess Lalla Hasna of Morocco; Members of British Royal Family and others.

Further Got Talent appearances 
In 2019, Simonova participated in America's Got Talent: The Champions auditions. When her performance ended, she got the golden buzzer from host Terry Crews, which sent her directly to the finals of the competition. Her performance in the finals, Love Always Wins, was well-received by the judges. Simon Cowell called it "one of the most beautiful acts in the history of Got Talent". At the end of the show, she finished in third place.

In August 2019 Simonova was announced as a confirmed act for Britain's Got Talent: The Champions on ITV. The show began on 31 August 2019, and ran for six weeks. Simonova appeared in the first episode. She performed a sand story called "Never Give Up". Simonova received a Golden Buzzer from one of the judges, Amanda Holden, and got into the finals of the show and became the first ever act to receive two Golden Buzzers on "The Champions" series of the Got Talent franchise.

In the final competition she performed a sand and snow story of Princess Diana and came in third in the Grand Finale.

World-renowned sand animation projects

Live or real-time performances 
Since 2009, Simonova has been invited as a special guest with her performances at events worldwide. In the end of 2009, she performed her sand story "Planet of Childhood" in the capital of Malta, Valletta, at the live charity marathon L'Istrina at the invitation of the president of Malta, George Abela.

In 2010, Simonova performed at the Victory Day Gala at the Royal Albert Hall as a special guest with her sand animations You Are Always Nearby and I Remember.

In 2011 in Monte Carlo, her sand story Chess opened the Amber chess tournament, which was appreciated by Albert II, Prince of Monaco.

In April 2011, Simonova created a sand story, Lady Dior Moscow, for Christian Dior and performed it in real-time, at the gala opening of a Dior-themed exhibition in Moscow, and was received well by fashion experts and Russian model Natalia Vodianova. In 2013, the film appeared in the 15 best fashion short films according to Paste.

In 2011, Simonova became a special guest at a number of big galas with symphony orchestras where she visualized in sand "The Four Seasons" (June 2011, Florence). Simonova was also a special guest with her performance at the Special Olympic Games' closing ceremony in Athens where she visualized in the history of Greece in sand.

In July 2011, Vodyanova invited Simonova to be a special guest with her sand animation performance at the Love Ball charity sponsored by her and the Naked Heart Foundation in Paris. Simonova performed a specially-crafted sand story about the life and charity impact of Vodyanova.

In January 2012, Simonova became a special guest of the king of Thailand's, Bhumibol Adulyadej, Thailand anniversary ceremonies in Bangkok, where she performed Long Live the King! After that Simonova was accepted by the princess and received her appreciation and presents. In return, Simonova presented the princess with two discs that hold "Long Live the King!" that she shot in her studio with Thai Ovation TV. The film "Long Live the King!" was viewed 1.5 million times on YouTube.

Simonova performed in Tokyo with Life Always Wins, which is devoted to the 2011 Tōhoku earthquake and tsunami, and her other sand stories.

During UEFA Euro 2012 in Ukraine, she performed her sand animation concert live at the St. Sophia Square in Kyiv to support the Ukraine national football team.

Simonova was a special guest of the international cultural fest Wadden Sea in Denmark under the patronage of Her Highness Princess Marie of Denmark, where the Danish government organized a set of concerts for Simonova. She was received well by the Princess during the festival (2012). In 2014 Simonova performed her sand animation with a symphony orchestra in the presence of Margrethe II of Denmark in Aalborg.

Since 2013, Simonova has created sand animation stories for Morocco Royal projects devoted to environment protection. One of them – a sand animation film "Beautiful Morocco", which is devoted to the history of kingdom and its environment protection, was viewed over 2 million times on YouTube. In 2016 she became a special guest of Morocco Awards gala under the patronage of Mohammed VI of Morocco.

In November 2015 in Thimphu, Bhutan, Simonova was a special guest at the ceremonies devoted to the 60th anniversary of Jigme Singye Wangchuk, father of Jigme Khesar Namgyel Wangchuk, who invited Simonova. She created a sand story, Gorgeous Bhutan. After the performance, she was praised by both kings, who expressed their appreciation of her artwork. She was also received by the royal couple – Jigme Khesar and Jetsun Pema in their palace, after which Khesar called Simonova his friend.

In 2016, Simonova presented a film, "Astana, my love" devoted to the capital of Kazakhstan, Astana, and depicting Kazakh nationhood, which was viewed over 30 thousand times within a few days on YouTube. She performed a sand animation about football in Milan at the gala presentation of the UEFA Champions League Cup, and created a sand animation video, Live, Serbia, which became popular in Serbia.

In 2017, she was invited to perform in the Belgrade National Theatre with her show devoted to Serbia. Her picture exhibition, organized in the central gallery of Belgrade called Progress, travelled to the five biggest cities of Serbia. She was warmly received by the minister of culture of Serbia Vladan Vukosavljević. Simonova was invited to bring her sand show to Belgrade.

In 2018, Simonova performed in the biggest concert hall of Greece with sand animation stories about Greece. At the end of the year she performed six shows in Hong Kong, which were viewed by more than 30,000 viewers.

Sand animation and music collaboration

Collaboration with symphony orchestras 
Simonova has performed her sand animation in real-time with a number of symphony orchestras, such as the YouTube Symphony orchestra, Symphony Orchestra della Toscana, the Royal Philharmonic Orchestra of Aalborg, Belgium National Orchestra, and the orchestra of Wermland opera.

Simonova started with a performance in Sydney during the online gala of the YouTube Symphony orchestra, including sand animation performance for Ascending Bird was viewed online 33 million times.

In 2017 Simonova performed with the Belgium National Orchestra conducted by Domingo Hindoyan, which played The Nutcracker.

In 2018 she became a special guest performer of Wermland opera orchestra's Christmas concert.

In August 2018 Simonova performed as a special guest at the Verbier Festival with pianists Georgy Gromov and Maria Masycheva. They played Cinderella by Prokofiev, and Simonova recreated the story in sand. They repeated this performance in Berlin in December 2018.

Sand animation and popular music 
In 2010, she collaborated with Japanese female singer-songwriter Fuyumi Abe, featuring in the music video of the single "Sora Ni Mau" performing sand animation.

In 2011, she returned to television competition in another form, performing on stage at the Eurovision Song Contest 2011, during the performance of Ukrainian entry by Mika Newton.

Simonova's sand animation Share Your Heart became the backdrop for Ukrainian entry at Eurovision 2011. Simonova created a sand animation story for the song "Angel". They performed in the second semifinals and the finals. Ukraine took fourth place. In an interview with Eurovision Radio International, Simonova confessed that she devoted Share Your Heart to children of the Simferopol orphanage house that she helped in that period. 

In 2012, Simonova collaborated with the youngest winner of the Grammy Awards, Esperanza Spalding. The result of cooperation was the sand animation video for the song "Endangered Species" devoted to Amazonia nature protection.

In 2014, Simonova shot two clips for the British rock band Menace founded by ex-Napalm Death member Mitch Harris. The video for the song "To the Marrow" was filmed in the technique of "snow graphics".

In 2014, she was featured in American R&B singer Joe's music video "If You Lose Her".

In 2015, sand animation by Simonova became the basis of a video clip for "The Wreck of the Edmund Fitzgerald", performed by the Canadian acapella band Cadence.

In May 2019 Simonova participated in Eurovision Song Contest 2019 as a part of Team Moldova, and created a stage act for Moldovan singer Anna Odobescu, where she performed snow animation.

Theatre 
Since 2013, Simonova and her team have been working on their show The Past Side of the Future, which Simonova described as a "visual solo performance". In May 2015, the show premiered in Yevatoriya.

Other genres of art

Graphics 
Aside from her sand animation, Simonova has worked as a graphic artist since 2005. In 2006, she founded her own style in graphics, psychoanalytic line graphics. Simonova works in this style from 2006 to the present day.

Literature 
Since her youth, Simonova wrote poems and prose. In school, she was engaged in literary research in English folk ballads and poetic translations of ballads, folk songs and poems of Shakespeare, Robert Burns and Lord Byron. In 2014, Simonova introduced the autobiographical book Another Story, illustrated with her own drawings.

Awards
 2009 - "Person of the Year" finalist, nominated under "New Generation" in Kyiv
 2013 - The title of Merited Artist of Ukraine
 2016 - the title of "Artist of the Year" at the annual award Yevpatorian Awards
2018 - The Human Rights Medal for volunteer and charity activity

Exhibitions 
In 2009, Simonova opened her first personal exhibition Sand Personality, which included over 300 pictures in sand art and graphics. The exhibition was presented in different cities of Crimea from 2009 to 2010.

In 2014, Simonova presented her second personal exhibition Another Story, which included 165 pictures in different genres – sand animation, graphics, painting.

In 2017 and 2018 her third exhibition, Sand Geography, opened in Simferopol and Evpatoriya. It is devoted to different places of the world she visited and managed to capture on paper. The exhibition included over 100 artworks of Simonova in sand drawing, graphics and painting.

Philanthropy
In June 2008, Simonova and Paskar founded a local open charity organization, Live, my Sun! (Живи, Солнышко!). The organization provides assistance to ill children in need of treatment, material and information support of cancer patients.

Collaboration with brands 
In 2010 Simonova shot a sand animation advertisement film for The Sunday Times.

In 2012, Simonova, supported by Puma, created series of sand animation short films called Dreamcatcher, which focuses on the lives and early dreams of prominent football players Cesc Fàbregas, Tomas Rosicky, Giorgio Chiellini, and Gianluigi Buffon. She met these players in their native places and interviewed them. During the interviews, she sketched their faces and expression and portrayed their childhood dreams in her sketchbook. Simonova and Puma presented these films during UEFA Euro 2012 in Ukraine on national TV channels and the Internet.

Current projects 
Since 2013, she has been working on the show White Era where she is planning to use all her skills in all animation techniques.

In 2017, Simonova began working on The Forgotten Kingdom — Sand Stories with the Guy Mendilow Ensemble, with multiple funding awards from the National Endowment for the Arts and The Boston Foundation.

References

External links 
 
 
 : official YouTube channel 
 : official YouTube channel 

1985 births
Living people
21st-century Ukrainian women artists
People from Yevpatoria
Ukrainian philanthropists
Recipients of the title of Merited Artist of Ukraine
Ukrainian performance artists
Tavrida National V.I. Vernadsky University alumni
Got Talent winners